The Battle of Ballantyne Pier occurred in Ballantyne Pier during a docker's strike in Vancouver, British Columbia, in June 1935.

The strike can be traced back to 1912 when the International Longshoremen's Association (ILA), began organizing the waterfront workers in Canada, alongside the Lumber Handlers' Union in Vancouver. Going head to head with the employers association, the Shipping Federation, several strikes resulting in wage increases were won by workers in the coming years. Victories on the waterfront increased over the next decade, and by 1923, the Shipping Federation became determined to break the power of the ILA.

A strike broke out in October 1923 which saw 1400 men joining picket lines at the Vancouver waterfront. However, provisions had been made by the Shipping Federation. The dockers were immediately met by 350 men armed with shotguns who had been housed on a nearby ship. This intimidation of the strikers, coupled with the fact that ships were still being loaded and unloaded by numerous non-union workers, forced the strike to collapse two months later.

The 1923 strike destroyed the ILA, and it was soon replaced by a new organization, the Vancouver and District Waterfront Workers' Association (VDWWA). Set up originally by the bosses as a company union, the VDWWA soon began to take a confrontational stance towards the Shipping Federation. By 1935, nearly every port in British Columbia had been organised by the VDWWA. Following the pretext to the destruction of the ILA, the Shipping Federation provoked another major strike in the spring of 1935, locking out 50 dockers at the port at Powell River.

The strike soon snowballed to bring other dockers across the region into the fold. Following a refusal to unload ships coming from Powell River, 900 workers were met with a lockout in Vancouver. Dockers across the border in Seattle also refused to unload ships coming from Vancouver and Powell River that were manned by non-union workers.

On June 18, several weeks after the original lockout, between 900-1100 dockers and their supporters marched through Vancouver towards Ballantyne Pier where non-union workers were unloading ships. The strikers were met at the pier by several hundred armed policemen. Attempting to force their way through, the dockers soon found themselves under attack from the police lines. Many marchers were clubbed as they tried to run to safety, while many others tried hopelessly to fight back, using whatever weapons they could find.

Aided by Mounties who had been posted nearby, the police continued to attack the strikers. The VDWWA union hall was attacked, with tear gas being used against members of the women's auxiliary who had set up a first aid station inside. The battle continued for three hours, and ended with several hospitalizations, including that of a fleeing striker who had been shot in the back of his legs.

Dragging on until December, the strike lost much of its militant character after the fighting at Ballantyne Pier. The struggle to form a union completely independent of the Shipping Federation continued for another two years, when, in 1937, the International Longshore and Warehouse Union (ILWU) was born.

The strike of 1935 failed. It, however, helped the future founding of a union for the dockers of British Columbia that was completely independent of the employers' association. The ILWU participated in numerous disputes in the following years, and in the 1940s, it was integral in winning many strikes that lead to better pay and conditions for waterfront workers.

Background

The Vancouver and District Waterfront Workers' Association (VDWWA) was established as a company union following a defeated longshoremen's strike in 1923, replacing the International Longshoremen's Association. Communist organizers with the Workers' Unity League (WUL) managed to seize control of the VDWWA's executive a decade later and transformed it into a militant union, which then began working towards strike action. A strike, more accurately a lock-out, finally commenced on 27 May 1935. That was several months after an agreement had been reached between the union and the Shipping Federation of British Columbia, but the terms were unfavourable to the longshoremen.

In late May, union membership voted to take over the despatching of work gangs on the harbour to load and unload ships as required. Despatching was a key issue for longshoremen, and prior to the 1923 strike had been carried out by the union. Longshoremen claimed that the Shipping Federation of British Columbia, an employers' association of waterfront-based companies and the main employer on the docks, unfairly discriminated against workers. Especially targeted were those considered sympathetic to an independent union or simply disliked by the despatcher, making the allocation of work a punitive mechanism and the job itself insecure. When the union unilaterally took over despatching, the Federation claimed that it was a violation of their agreement and locked out the longshoremen. Replacement workers, known pejoratively as "scabs" by strikers, were mobilized along with hundreds of police specials, who were recruited to break the strike.

Anticommunist context
Meanwhile, nearly 2000 relief camp workers flooded into Vancouver on 4 April 1935. These were unemployed men protesting the conditions of the federal relief camps that were set up as a stop-gap solution to the unemployment crisis by the Department of Defence. Camp inmates were also organized under the Workers' Unity League into the Relief Camp Workers' Union. Communist leaders were attempting to merge the two strikes and spark a general strike. The Shipping Federation and the police were aware of the plan and claimed it was an attempt to start a Bolshevik revolution on the Pacific Coast. Thus, when the waterfront strike finally began, tensions were already high between anticommunists and strikers.

Historians agree that both strikes were driven by legitimate grievances: abysmal conditions in the relief camps and despatching and other workplace issues on the waterfront. Nevertheless, a massive mobilization that included all three levels of police, with specials attached to each police force, took place in anticipation of an attempted revolution. Specials trained at the Beatty Street Drill Hall under Brigadier-General Victor Odlum and Colonel C.E. Edgett and were co-ordinated by a group called the Citizens' League of British Columbia, a vigilante organization funded by the Shipping Federation. Militia units based in the Point Grey neighbourhood of Vancouver and in Victoria, British Columbia were also ready to be called to action on short notice. The Point Grey militia, however, consisted of inmates of a specially-designated relief camp, and many of them eventually joined the relief camp strikers.

The communist plan to merge the strikes and spark a general strike failed except for a one-day demonstration commemorating May Day. On 3 June 1935, shortly after the waterfront strike began, the relief camp strikers left the city to begin the On-to-Ottawa Trek in an effort to take their grievance to the nation's capital. Nevertheless, the authorities persisted in conflating the waterfront strike with revolution, perhaps because they were alarmed by the waterfront strike in the United States the previous year that had shut down most shipping operations along the American coast and culminated in a bloody general strike in San Francisco.

The battle
On 18 June 1935, about 1000 protesters, consisting of striking longshoremen and their supporters, marched towards the Heatley Street entrance to Ballantyne Pier, where strikebreakers were unloading ships in the harbour.

Unlike earlier waterfront strikes, longshoremen were prevented from picketing the docks to discourage strikebreaking and claimed that they were going to go en masse to talk to the non-union workers. They were led by Victoria Cross recipient Mickey O'Rourke and a contingent of World War I veterans and marched behind a Union Jack flag, to great symbolic effect. At the entrance to the pier, they were met by Chief Constable Colonel W. W. Foster, who warned the demonstrators that they would not be permitted to proceed. When they refused to turn back, protesters were attacked with clubs by the police guarding the pier.

Within minutes, more police joined in the fight. In addition to the Vancouver police, contingents from the British Columbia Provincial Police, who had been hiding behind boxcars, and the Royal Canadian Mounted Police engaged with demonstrators. The police chased the dispersing crowd, continuing to club people even as they fled and fired tear gas. Many protesters fought back, throwing rocks and other projectiles at the police, and others who were attacked were simply trying to flee the scene.

That continued for three hours and spread throughout the nearby residential district. Several people, both police and protesters, were hospitalized as a result of the riot, and one bystander was shot in the back of his legs by a police shotgun. Offices of communist organizers and the longshoremen's union were also raided, with tear gas shot through the windows to drive out any occupants before the police entered. Strike supporters set up a makeshift hospital at the Ukrainian Hall, and the police did the same for their wounded at the Coroner's Court on Cordova Street. In total, 28 out of the 60 injured were hospitalized and 24 men were arrested. Mayor Gerry McGeer declared that striking longshoremen would no longer be eligible for relief payments for themselves or their families.

Outcome
The Battle of Ballantyne was the bloody climax of a very volatile year in Vancouver, but fell far short of the insurrection anticipated by the police and anticommunists. It was also a turning point in the waterfront strike, which, although it dragged on until December, lost its optimistic and militant character after the battle. Longshoremen, however, would continue to fight for the right to organize an independent union and to control dispatching, and finally succeeded a decade later when they formed the International Longshore and Warehouse Union (ILWU), Local 500.

It was also the last of WUL militancy that Vancouver would witness. That same year, the Comintern in Moscow abandoned its Third Period strategy, which entailed the creation of the Workers' Unity League and similar militant trade union organizations in other countries with the goal of building a radical labour movement separate from mainstream labour organizations. Under the new Popular Front strategy, Communists joined established unions and helped to build the Congress of Industrial Organizations. Moreover, Communist priorities shifted from the industrial to the political arena, where they fielded candidates and supported Cooperative Commonwealth Federation candidates, while others joined the Mackenzie-Papineau Battalion to fight Franco's fascists in the Spanish Civil War.

While far more localized than the On-to-Ottawa Trek, the Battle of Ballantyne Pier was part of the fierce, and perhaps paranoid, anticommunist reaction provoked by the Communists and the militant workers' movement they led. Public attitudes shifted away from the Conservative government of R.B. "Iron Heel" Bennett because of its mishandling of depression-era unrest in such events, which paved the way for Bennett's defeat in the federal election that same year. Although machine guns were not used in the riot, another First World War technology was introduced in Vancouver policing that day: tear gas. Another major clash between the unemployed and the police took place in 1938. Relief camp workers returned to the city and were violently evicted from Post Office by means of tear gas bombs and police clubs (primarily the Royal Canadian Mounted Police in that instance).

See also

 1918 Vancouver general strike
Estevan Riot
On-to-Ottawa Trek

References

Alex Aspden, "1935: Battle of Ballantyne Pier," Libcom.org (Sep 16 2007)
Lorne Brown, When Freedom was Lost: The Unemployed, the Agitator, and the State. Montreal: Black Rose Books, 1987.
Michael Kevin Dooley, "'Our Mickey': The Story of Private James O'Rourke, VC.MM (CEF), 1879-1957," Labour/Le Travail 47 (Spring 2001).
 Chris Madsen, New Westminster Waterfront Strike - 1935, BC Labour Heritage Centre booklet and plaque
R. C. McCandless, "Vancouver's 'Red Menace' of 1935: The Waterfront Situation," BC Studies 22 (1974): 56–70.
Andrew Parnaby, "On the Hook: Welfare Capitalism on the Vancouver Waterfront, 1919-1939," PhD thesis, Memorial University, 2001.
John Stanton, Never Say Die!: The Life and Times of a Pioneer Labour Lawyer. Vancouver, Steel Rail Publishing, 1987.
David Ricardo Williams, Mayor Gerry: The Remarkable Gerald Grattan McGeer. Vancouver: Douglas & McIntyre, 1986.
Fred Wilson, "The Bloody Road to Ballantyne," in Sean Griffin, ed., Fighting Heritage: Highlights of the 1930s Struggle for Jobs and Militant Unionism in British Columbia. Vancouver: Tribune Publishing, 1985, 65–74.

External links

 ILWU, local 500

Great Depression in Canada
Communism in Canada
Protest marches in Canada
Labour disputes in British Columbia
Political history of British Columbia
History of Vancouver
Riots and civil disorder in Canada
1935 labor disputes and strikes
1935 riots
Maritime strikes
Royal Canadian Mounted Police
1935 in British Columbia
June 1935 events
1935 protests